The Trommald Building is a historic building in Enumclaw, Washington, that was listed on the National Register of Historic Places on August 24, 2000 (ID #00000972). It was built in 1915 by Tacoma dry goods merchant Erick G. Trommald for $30,000 adjoining Enumclaw's first modern office building, the Jensen Building. Trommald commissioned notable Tacoma architects Heath & Gove to plan the structure.

The building is significant for its relatively intact architecture, influenced by the Chicago School style. The Trommald building was part of a city beautiful movement in the 1910s and 1920s to replace dilapidated wooden buildings with fireproof brick buildings.

References

History of King County, Washington
National Register of Historic Places in King County, Washington
Buildings and structures in Enumclaw, Washington
Chicago school architecture in Washington (state)
Commercial buildings on the National Register of Historic Places in Washington (state)

Buildings and structures completed in 1915